Duquesne Heights  is a neighborhood in Pittsburgh, Pennsylvania's south city area.  It has a zip code of 15211, and has representation on Pittsburgh City Council by the council member for District 2 (West and Southwest Neighborhoods).

City Steps
The Duquesne Heights neighborhood has 14 distinct flights of city steps - many of which are open and in a safe condition. In Duquesne Heights, the Steps of Pittsburgh quickly connect pedestrians to public transportation and provide an easy way to access the Emerald View Park Greenway trails.

Surrounding neighborhoods
Duquesne Heights has four Pittsburgh neighborhood borders, including the South Shore at the bottom of the hillside to the north (with the Duquesne Incline as the only direct link), Mt. Washington to the east, Beechview to the southwest and West End Valley to the west and northwest.

See also
 List of Pittsburgh neighborhoods

References

Further reading

External links

Interactive Pittsburgh Neighborhoods Map

Neighborhoods in Pittsburgh